Ralph Wulford (1479?–1499) (also Ralph Wilford), was a pretender of the Earl of Warwick.

Life
He is described in Robert Fabyan's Chronicles as son of a cordwainer in London, and he was not improbably a member of the London and Kent family of Wilford [for example, see Sir James Wilford]. He resembles Lambert Simnel in the obscurity of his origin. And, like Simnel, he was one of the tools used by the Yorkists in their endeavours to overthrow Henry VII. Like Simnel, too, he was made to impersonate the Earl of Warwick, eldest son of Edward IV's brother, the Duke of Clarence (see Edward, 1475–1499), though, according to Fabyan, Wilford only ‘avaunced himself to be the son or heir to the Earl of Warwick's lands’ (Chronicle, p. 686) — an absurd statement in view of the fact that Warwick was not more than four years older than Wulford. Wulford was educated for the part by one Patrick, an Austin friar, and in 1498, rumours were spread abroad that that year was likely to be one of great danger for Henry VII (Cal. State Papers, Spanish, i. 206). Wulford began to confide to various persons in Kent — the scene of Warbeck's early attempts — that he was the real Earl of Warwick. Henry VII had, however, learned to be prompt in dealing with pretenders, and before the conspirators could take definite action both Wulford and his preceptor were arrested.

Death
Wulford was executed on Shrove Tuesday, 12 February 1499. Patrick was imprisoned for life.

Notes

References
Polydore Vergil's Historia, p. 770
Francis Bacon, The history of Henry VII, of England: written in the year 1616, Publisher Logographic Press, 1786, page 227
John Lingard, A history of England, from the first invasion by the Romans, Volume 5, Publisher J. Mawman, 1823, page 436
Attribution

1479 births
1499 deaths
Executed people from London
Pretenders